Grootfontein Air Force Base  is an air base of the Namibian Air Force in Grootfontein, a city in the Otjozondjupa Region of Namibia.

It was formerly an air base for the South African Air Force. It was also the headquarters of the Namibian Air Force until these were moved to Karibib Air Force Base in 2016.

The Grootfontein non-directional beacon (Ident: GF) and VOR-DME (Ident: GFV) are located on the field.

Commanding officers

Image gallery

See also
Transport in Namibia
List of airports in Namibia

References

External links
OurAirports - Grootfontein Airport
OpenStreetMap - Grootfontein

SkyVector - Grootfontein Airport

Airports in Namibia
Otjozondjupa Region
Military of Namibia